The following is a list of largest currently operating tram and light rail transit systems.

List

Notes

See also
 List of town tramway systems
 List of tram and light rail transit systems
 List of largest tram and light rail transit systems ever
 History of tram and light rail transit systems by country

References

largest currently operating tram and light rail transit systems
Light rail
largest currently operating tram and light rail transit systems